Henbury Village Hall was built as a school in the Henbury area of Bristol, England.

It was built in 1830 in a Tudor Revival style by Thomas Rickman, on the site of a charity school which had stood on the site since 1601.

It has been designated by English Heritage as a grade II listed building.

References

See also
 Grade II listed buildings in Bristol

Grade II listed buildings in Bristol
School buildings completed in 1830
Thomas Rickman buildings
1830 establishments in England
Henbury